Avigdor Stematsky (1908–1989) was a Russian Empire-born Israeli painter. He is considered one of the pioneers of Israeli abstract art.

Biography
Stematsky was born in 1908 in Odessa. He joined the Massad group in Tel Aviv. In 1929, he went to Paris to study at Académie de la Grande Chaumière and Académie Colarossi. He was one of the founders of the New Horizons group. He held his first solo exhibition at the Tel Aviv Museum of Art at the age of 31.  In the constellation of Israel art, Stematsky and Yehezkiel Streichman stand out as a pair. Although each developed his own distinct, individual style, there are many points of affinity between them: a common background as students of Bezalel in the 1920s, a response to the influences of the Jewish School of Paris in the 1930s, and of the "modern" (late cubist) art in the 1940s and fifties, when they were also leading teachers in Tel Aviv.

Gallery

Education 
 1925–26  – Herzliya Hebrew Gymnasium, Tel Aviv
 1926–28 – Bezalel Academy of Arts and Design Jerusalem, with Arie Aroch, Moshe Castel and others
 1928 – Technion, Haifa, Architecture
 1929 – Yitzhak Frenkel Studio, Tel Aviv
 1930–31 –  Académie de la Grande Chaumière, Paris, with Avni

Teaching 
 1954-58 Studio with Yehezkel Streichman which was active until 1948
 1952–60 Avni Institute of Art and Design, Tel Aviv
 1973, 1977 Haifa University and Avni Institute of Art and Design

Awards and prizes 
 1941 The Dizengoff Prize for Painting and Sculpture, Municipality of Tel Aviv-Yafo, Tel Aviv
 1956 The Dizengoff Prize for Painting and Sculpture, Municipality of Tel Aviv-Yafo, Tel Aviv
 1958 Ramat Gan Prize
 1965 Milo Club Prize
 1967 First Prize Tower of David Exhibition, Jerusalem
 1973 The Meir Sherman Prize, Israel Museum, Jerusalem
 1976 Sandberg Prize for Israeli Art, Israel Museum, Jerusalem

See also 
 Culture of Israel

References

External links 

 
 
 

1908 births
1989 deaths
Israeli artists
Israeli painters
Jewish School of Paris
Alumni of the Académie de la Grande Chaumière
Académie Colarossi alumni
Sandberg Prize recipients
Burials at Kiryat Shaul Cemetery
Soviet emigrants to Mandatory Palestine